Ling Kok Shan is the second highest peak on Lamma Island in Hong Kong, after Mount Stenhouse, with a height of  above sea level.

Access
There is a concrete trail leading up to the summit. This is a gentle walk and can be done year-round.

References

See also

 List of mountains, peaks and hills in Hong Kong

Lamma Island